In mathematics, a homology manifold (or generalized manifold)
is a locally compact topological space X that looks locally like a topological manifold from the point of view of homology theory.

Definition
A homology G-manifold  (without boundary) of dimension n over an abelian  group G of coefficients is a locally compact topological space X with finite G-cohomological dimension such that for any x∈X, the  homology groups

are trivial unless p=n, in which case they are isomorphic to G. Here H is some homology theory, usually singular homology. Homology manifolds are the same as homology Z-manifolds.

More generally, one can define homology manifolds with boundary, by allowing the local homology groups to vanish
at some points, which are of course called the boundary of the homology manifold. The boundary of an n-dimensional first-countable homology manifold is an n−1 dimensional homology manifold (without boundary).

Examples
Any topological manifold is a homology manifold. 
An example of a homology manifold that is not a manifold is the suspension of a homology sphere that is not a sphere.

Properties
If X×Y is a  topological manifold, then X and Y are homology manifolds.

References

W. J .R. Mitchell, "Defining the boundary of a homology manifold", Proceedings of the American Mathematical Society, Vol. 110, No. 2. (Oct., 1990), pp. 509-513.

Algebraic topology
Generalized manifolds